Carderock may refer to a location in the United States:

Carderock, Maryland, along the Potomac River near Washington, D.C.
Carderock Division of the Naval Surface Warfare Center
Carderock Springs Historic District
Carderock Recreation Area a climbing area